Pactolus, now named Sart Çayı, is a river near the Aegean coast of Turkey. The river rises from Mount Tmolus, flows through the ruins of the ancient city of Sardis, and empties into the Gediz River, the ancient Hermus.  The Pactolus once contained electrum that was the basis of the economy of the ancient state of Lydia which used the naturally occurring alloy of gold and silver to forge the first coins under Alyattes of Lydia.

Legend
According to legend, King Midas divested himself of the golden touch by washing himself in the river. The historian Herodotus claimed that the gold contained in the sediments carried by the river was the source of the wealth of King Croesus, son of Alyattes.

Propertius 1.6

The river is mentioned in Sextus Propertius' Elegy 1.6.
"at tu seu mollis qua tendit Ionia, seu qua
Lydia Pactoli tingit arata liquor..."
("But wherever either soft Ionia extends, or wherever the water of the Pactulus stains the Lydian fields...")

References 

Rivers of Turkey
Landforms of Manisa Province
Water and religion